The Maeotians were an ancient people dwelling along the Sea of Azov, which was known in antiquity as the "Maeotian marshes" or "Lake Maeotis". They are often considered to be the ancestors of the Circassians, Abkhazians, and Abazins.

Identity
The etymology of the name and identity of the people remain unclear. Edward James and William Smith were of the opinion that the term Maeotian was applied broadly to various peoples around the Sea of Azov,  rather than the name of the sea deriving from a certain people. Their subdivisions included the Sindi, the Dandarii, the Toreatae, the Agri, the Arrechi, the Tarpetes, the Obidiaceni, the Sittaceni, the Dosci, and "many" others. Of these, the Sindi are the best attested, and were probably the dominant people among the Maeotians. The language of the Maeotians or even language family is uncertain. One princess of the Ixomates was called Tirgatao, comparable to  Tirgutawiya, a name on a tablet discovered in Hurrian Alalakh.

Karl Eichwald claimed that the Maeotians originated as a "Hindu" (Indian) colony, but this view is rejected by the majority of scholars. Soviet archaeologists, historians, and ethnographers concluded the Maeotians were one of the Circassian tribes. The Cambridge Ancient History classifies the Maeotians as either of a people of Cimmerian ancestry or as Caucasian aboriginals.

History
The earliest known reference is from the logographer Hellanicus of Lesbos. According to Strabo, the Maeotians lived partly on fish and partly from agriculture but were as warlike as their nomadic neighbors. These wild hordes were sometimes tributary to the factor at the River Tanais (the present-day Don) and at other times to the Bosporani. In later times, especially under Pharnaces II, Asander, and Polemon I, the Bosporan Kingdom extended as far as the Tanais.

References

Sources

Cimmerians
Ancient Circassian tribes
Ancient peoples of Russia
History of the western steppe
Scythia